The oak-ribbed skeletonizer (Bucculatrix albertiella) is a moth species of the family Bucculatricidae. It was first described by August Busck in 1910. It is found along the west coast of the United States.

The wingspan is 8–9 mm.

The larvae feed on Quercus species.

External links
Bug Guide

Bucculatricidae
Moths described in 1910
Moths of North America